The artistic gymnastic competitions at the 2011 Pan American Games was held at the Nissan Gymnastics Stadium in October 27. The results of the qualification determined the qualifiers to the finals.

Final

Overall Results

Vault 1 Details

Vault 2 Details

Qualification

References

Gymnastics at the 2011 Pan American Games
2011 in women's gymnastics